ARY News is a Pakistani news channel launched on 26 September 2004 with the name "ARY One", the channel was later renamed to "ARY One World" until May 2009 when it was rebranded as "ARY News". A bilingual news channel in English and Urdu, it is a part of the ARY Digital Network, which is a subsidiary of ARY Group. ARY is an acronym of Abdul Razzak Yaqoob, who was the owner of ARY Group. ARY News is biggest and most watched news channel in Pakistan and all around the world. ARY head office located in Karachi, Pakistan.

Sister channels

ARY Digital - general entertainment channel
ARY Musik - music channel
ARY Qtv  - religious channel
ARY Zindagi - general entertainment channel
A Sports -  sports channel
ARY Nick - kids channels

Popular programs 
Bouncer
 Criminals Most Wanted (Sunday 7-8 PM)
 Sar e Aam (Saturday 7:00 PM)
 Off The Record  (Monday to Thursday 8:00 PM)
 Sawal Yeh Hai  (Monday To Thursday 11:00 PM)
11th Hour (Monday To Friday 10 PM)
Hoshyarian  (Friday To Sunday 11:00 PM)
Bakhabar Savera (Monday to Friday 9-10 AM)
Aiteraz Hai (Friday To Sunday 8-9 PM)
Jahan Bean
 The Reporters (Monday to Friday 7-8 PM)
Zimmedar Kaun (Sunday 5-6 PM)

Special program
Eid Studio
Har Lamha Purjosh (cricket special)

Former shows
Agar
Ab Tak
Andar Ki Baat
Anjaam
Jurm Bolta Hai
Khabar Say Khabar Tak
Hamare Mehmaan
Jugnu Ki Roshni
Late Edition
The Morning Show
 Umar Sharif Showman
 Power Play

International availability
ARY News is available in the United States via Dish Network.

ARY News is available in the UK as ‘New Vision TV (ARY World)’ on SKY.

See also 

 List of news channels in Pakistan

References

External links
 https://www.arynews.tv (official site)

ARY Digital
24-hour television news channels in Pakistan
Television channels and stations established in 2004
2004 establishments in Pakistan
Urdu-language mass media
Television stations in Pakistan
Television stations in Karachi